Pump Up the Valuum is the eighth studio album by the American punk rock band NOFX. It was released on June 13, 2000, on Epitaph Records, their last through the company.

Production 
The album's title deliberately misspells the trademark "Valium" to avoid a lawsuit, similar to the one The Melvins faced for their album Lysol. This is explained in the 45 Or 46 Songs... album booklet.

The initial song, "And Now for Something Completely Similar," is a parody of the famous saying "And Now for Something Completely Different" from Monty Python skits. As a prank, the intro sounds very similar to "Linoleum" from the band's 1994 album Punk in Drublic, right down to El Hefe warming up his voice before the song begins, while the solo bass part echoes Shadows of Defeat from Good Riddance. Both similarities are addressed in the song's lyrics.

The song "Dinosaurs Will Die" features a part of the intro skit from The F.U.'s song "Civil Defense" off the album 'Kill For Christ'. The words which are spoken during this intro ("This is not a test of the emergency broadcast system") also appear in the Bad Religion song "Los Angeles Is Burning", on their 2004 album "The Empire Strikes First".

The band recorded eight more songs that were left off the final version of the album. According to Fat Mike, "...the title track 'Pump Up the Valuum' got cut from the album. That's weird. We gave it to Epitaph for Punk O Rama 5."  Three other songs were mentioned in the Pump Up the Valuum booklet, which appeared elsewhere: "Medio-core" (later in The War on Errorism, 2003); "Insulted By Germans" (later in 7" of the Month #1, 2005, and Wolves In Wolves' Clothing, 2006); and  "One Way Ticket to Fuckneckville" (later in Aggropop Now 2003, The War on Errorism, and 7" of the Month #7, 2005). Other outtakes include "Pods and Gods", "Lower", "Bath of Least Resistance", "San Francisco Fat", and "Pump Up the Valium".

Release 
On November 19, 1999, it was reported that NOFX's next album would be titled Pump Up the Valuum. On March 23, 2000, the album was announced for release in June. "Take Two Placebos and Call Me Lame" was posted on Epitaph's website for free download on April 16, 2000. "Bottles to the Ground" was sent to radio in May 2000. In May and June 2001, the band went on a tour of North-western US, and the western Canada. The band embarked on a brief US tour in October and November 2001, with support from Frenzal Rhomb and the Mad Caddies. In February 2002, the band toured across Australia with Frenzal Rhomb. The band played 10 shows in the US with Rancid in April 2002.

Critical reception 

In 2005, Pump Up the Valuum was ranked number 331 in Rock Hard magazine's book The 500 Greatest Rock & Metal Albums of All Time. The album was included at number 17 on Rock Sounds "The 51 Most Essential Pop Punk Albums of All Time" list.

Track listing

Personnel 
 Fat Mike – vocals, bass
 Eric Melvin – guitar, accordion
 El Hefe – guitar
 Erik Sandin – drums
 Spike Slawson – additional vocals
 Bill Hansson – accordion
 Ryan Greene, Fat Mike – producers
 Ryan Greene – mixing, recording
 Adam Krammer – additional engineer

Charts

References 
Citations

Sources

External links 

Pump Up the Valuum at YouTube (streamed copy where licensed)

NOFX albums
2000 albums
Epitaph Records albums
Albums produced by Ryan Greene